The Tongoni Ruins (Magofu ya kale ya Tongoni in Swahili) are a 15th century Swahili ruins of a mosque and forty tombs located in Tongoni ward in Tanga District inside Tanga Region of Tanzania. The area was a different place four to five centuries ago. Contrary to its almost unnoticed presence today, it was a prosperous and a respected Swahili trading centre during the 15th century. Most of the ruins are still not yet been uncovered. The site is a registered National Historic Site.

History
Tongoni was established around the tenth century by Swahili residents as part of the Swahili city states dotted along the East African coast.

Vasco da Gama, the Portuguese sailor, first visited Tongoni in April 1498. He had the opportunity to eat the local oranges, which he said were better than those available in Portugal. He made a second visit the following year, and spent fifteen days in Tongoni.

Management
The ruins at Tongoni are under the Tanzanian Antiquities department of the Ministry of Natural Resources and Tourism. The ruins are open to the public but there have been no Phase III excavations. Decades ago, a small test excavation was conducted at the site and a site plan was drawn.

See also
Historic Swahili Settlements
Swahili architecture
National Historic Sites in Tanzania

References

National Historic Sites in Tanga Region
National Historic Sites in Tanzania
Buildings and structures in the Tanga Region
Tourist attractions in the Tanga Region
Swahili people
Swahili city-states
Swahili culture
Ruins in Tanzania
Archaeological sites in Tanzania
Archaeological sites of Eastern Africa